The  FMC Asian Individual Squash Championships are the event which serves as the individual Asian championship for squash players organised by the Asian Squash Federation. The Asian Individual Championships was first held in 1981.

Past results

Men's championship

Women's championship

Statistics

Men

Women

See also 
 Asian Squash Federation
 Asian Squash Team Championships

References

http://tribune.com.pk/story/544870/15-year-wait-ends-as-aamir-triumphs/

External links 
 Asian Squash Federation website
 Asian Individual Championships Squashsite 2011

Squash_Championships
Squash in Asia
Squash tournaments
Squash records and statistics
Recurring sporting events established in 1981